Citrus Heights is a city in Sacramento County, California, United States. As of the 2020 U.S. Census, the city had a population of 87,583, up from 83,301 at the 2010 U.S. Census.

History
Citrus Heights voters approved the measure to incorporate the City on November 5, 1996, effective January 1, 1997. The measure won, with 62.5% of the votes. The city incorporated on January 2, 1997 (January 1 according to the official city website), becoming the fifth city in Sacramento County.

Geography

Climate
Citrus Heights has a climate that is characterized by mild winters and dry hotter summers. The area usually has a low humidity and the average temperature throughout the year is 68 Fahrenheit, with the daily average ranging from 45° in December and January to 76° in July. Average daily high temperatures range from 53° in December and January to 93° in July. Average daily low temperatures range from 38° to 58°. The average year has 73 days with a high over 90°, with the highest temperature on record being 114° on July 17, 1925, and 18 days when the low drops below 32°, with the coldest one day record being December 11, 1932, at 17°.

Average yearly precipitation is 24.61 inches according to weather.com (2018). Almost no rain falls during the summer months (less than 1%), and over 80% falls between November and March. 3.47", 3.39", 4.46", and 4.34" per month respectively, though rainfall can be much greater than average. On average, 96 days in the year have fog, mostly in the morning, primarily in December and January. Typically, Citrus Heights enjoys 268 sunny days throughout the year.

Demographics

Citrus Heights is part of the Sacramento–Arden-Arcade–Roseville Metropolitan Statistical Area.

2010
At the 2010 census Citrus Heights had a population of 83,301. The racial makeup of Citrus Heights was 66,856 (80.3%) White, 2,751 (3.3%) African American, 753 (0.9%) Native American, 2,714 (3.3%) Asian (1.2% Filipino, 0.4% Indian, 0.4% Chinese, 0.3% Japanese, 0.2% Vietnamese, 0.4% Other), 363 (0.4%) Pacific Islander, 5,348 (6.4%) from other races, and 4,516 (5.4%) from two or more races. Hispanic or Latino of any race were 13,734 persons (16.5%).

The census reported that 82,815 people (99.4% of the population) lived in households, 304 (0.4%) lived in non-institutionalized group quarters, and 182 (0.2%) were institutionalized.

There were 32,686 households, 10,452 (32.0%) had children under the age of 18 living in them, 14,241 (43.6%) were opposite-sex married couples living together, 4,689 (14.3%) had a female householder with no husband present, 2,027 (6.2%) had a male householder with no wife present.  There were 2,653 (8.1%) unmarried opposite-sex partnerships, and 252 (0.8%) same-sex married couples or partnerships. 8,860 households (27.1%) were one person and 3,280 (10.0%) had someone living alone who was 65 or older. The average household size was 2.53.  There were 20,957 families (64.1% of households); the average family size was 3.08.

The age distribution was 19,241 people (23.1%) under the age of 18, 8,480 people (10.2%) aged 18 to 24, 23,022 people (27.6%) aged 25 to 44, 21,473 people (25.8%) aged 45 to 64, and 11,085 people (13.3%) who were 65 or older.  The median age was 36.2 years. For every 100 females, there were 94.1 males.  For every 100 females age 18 and over, there were 91.0 males.

There were 35,075 housing units at an average density of 2,465.1 per square mile, of the occupied units 18,832 (57.6%) were owner-occupied and 13,854 (42.4%) were rented. The homeowner vacancy rate was 2.7%; the rental vacancy rate was 7.8%.  47,329 people (56.8% of the population) lived in owner-occupied housing units and 35,486 people (42.6%) lived in rental housing units.

2000
At the 2000 census there  were 85,071 people in 33,478 households, including 21,660 families, in the city. The population density was 5,929.3 inhabitants per square mile (2,288.9/km). The racial makeup of the city was 84.64% White, 2.87% African American, 1.01% Native American, 2.85% Asian, 0.34% Pacific Islander, 3.56% from other races, and 4.73% from two or more races. Hispanic or Latino of any race were 10.04%.

Of the 33,478 households 30.9% had children under the age of 18 living with them, 46.4% were married couples living together, 12.9% had a female householder with no husband present, and 35.3% were non-families. 26.9% of households were one person and 9.5% were one person aged 65 or older. The average household size was 2.52 and the average family size was 3.06.

The age distribution was 25.2% under the age of 18, 10.2% from 18 to 24, 30.3% from 25 to 44, 21.3% from 45 to 64, and 12.9% 65 or older. The median age was 35 years. For every 100 females, there were 93.7 males. For every 100 females age 18 and over, there were 90.4 males.

The median household income was $53,859 and the median family income  was $60,207. Males had a median income of $48,614 versus $39,399 for females. The per capita income for the city was $30,744. About 5.6% of families and 8.3% of the population were below the poverty line, including 10.9% of those under age 18 and 6.1% of those age 65 or over.

Economy
Citrus Heights has a mall (Sunrise Mall) and several other shopping centers and big-box stores (including Target and Lowe's, located in the Marketplace at Birdcage across the street from Sunrise Mall, as well as Walmart, Costco Wholesale, and Sam's Club).

Government

Citrus Heights has supported the Republican candidate in all six presidential elections since its incorporation. In the six gubernatorial elections since its incorporation, Democrats have carried the city twice, and Republicans have carried the city four times.

Education
Citrus Heights is primarily served by the San Juan Unified School District.  San Juan is the ninth largest school district in California and serves a  area in northeast Sacramento County, including Citrus Heights.  Within the city of Citrus Heights there are ten elementary schools, one middle school, and two high schools.  These schools serve over 10,000 students from the city of Citrus Heights.  San Juan Unified School District also offers other educational schools and programs such as a special education centers, adult schools, adult handicapped schools, preschool, and before- and after-school programs.  Universities and colleges that serve the area include: University of California, Davis; California State University, Sacramento; American River College; Sierra College; McGeorge School of Law; Lincoln Law School of Sacramento; Golden Gate University; University of Phoenix; and National University.

Infrastructure

Transportation
Citrus Heights is centrally located between the region's major freeways and highways. The Business Interstate 80 freeway, otherwise known as the Capital City Freeway, begins near downtown Sacramento and ends a few miles southwest of Citrus Heights. Public bus transportation is currently provided by the Sacramento Regional Transit District.

Police department
In June 2006, the City of Citrus Heights formed its own police department. The department attracted lateral police officers from 62 different police agencies throughout California. Under the leadership of Chief of Police Christopher Boyd, the newly formed department took over law enforcement responsibility from the Sacramento County Sheriff's Department on June 26, 2006. The police department is a full-service agency, with specialty units such as SWAT, Special Investigations, Traffic and School Resource Officers. The department operates its own state-of-the-art communications center, which answers 9-1-1 calls and dispatches police throughout the city.

Notable people
 Bill Conroy - MLB catcher
 Joseph James DeAngelo - Golden State Killer
 Kelley Jones - artist 
 Mandisa - singer
 Jackie Lynn Taylor - Our Gang actress (1934)

See also
 Rusch Botanical Gardens
 Stones Gambling Hall Cheating Scandal (aka Postlegate)
 Sunrise Mall

References

External links

 Official website

 
Cities in Sacramento County, California
Cities in Sacramento metropolitan area
Populated places established in 1997
1997 establishments in California
Incorporated cities and towns in California